Biman Mukhopadhyay (September 1930 – 16 March 2011) was a famous Bengali singer and trainer.

Early life and education
After his graduation from the Scottish Church College, at the University of Calcutta, he started on a career of music.

Career
He was described by Padmabhusan Pt. Jnan Prakash Ghosh as a "living Encyclopedia of Music" in 1970 in a program organized by Rajya Sangeet Academy. Many famous Bengali singers like Smt. Angur Bala, Smt. Sandhya Mukhopadhyay, late Hemanta Kumar Mukhopadhyay, late Manabendra Mukhopadhyay, Smt. Purabi Dutta, Smt. Indrani Sen, Smt. Haimanti Sukla, Smt. Sipra Bose have recorded their songs under his training.

Awards
Harmonica Sangeet Samman given by Innovative Systems Ltd.(2007).
Uttam Kumar Award given by Shilpi Sansad (2008).

References

External links
 https://web.archive.org/web/20110423223751/http://bimanmukhopadhyay.org/

1930 births
2011 deaths
Bengali singers
Scottish Church College alumni
University of Calcutta alumni
Indian music educators

Singers from West Bengal